The World Congress on Marxism is an academic congress under the name of Marxism held in mainland China.

According to the website of Peking University, the congress was "approved by the Ministry of Education of China, under the guidance and support of the Publicity Department of the Communist Party of China and the Beijing Municipal Party Committee and Municipal Government. It was sponsored by Peking University."

The first congress was held in Beijing on October 10–11, 2015. More than 400 Chinese and foreign scholars attended the congress. The second congress was held in Beijing on May 5–6, 2018. It coincided with the 200th anniversary of the birth of Karl Marx. The theme of the second congress was "Marxism and a Human Community with Shared Destiny".

According to the organizer, Peking University, the congress will be held every two years or so.

References

External links 
 

2015 establishments in China
Recurring events established in 2015
Annual events in China
Peking University
International conferences